Ballina Byron Gateway Airport  is a small regional airport located at Ballina, New South Wales, Australia. It is owned and operated by Ballina Shire Council.

It serves Ballina and the nearby town of Byron Bay, a 20-minute drive north. Ballina Airport handled 365,200 passengers in the 2012/13 financial year.

An occasional bus service operates to and from the airport, except on Christmas Day.

In 2005 Ballina Airport was renamed Ballina Byron Gateway Airport in a bid to attract more people to the area.

A master plan for an upgrade and expansion of the terminal has been drawn up and may be constructed with a new glass facade facing the apron and runway as well as a new drop-off/pick-up area and multiple interior changes. This is due to the increase in numbers since the introduction of jet services by Jetstar and Virgin Australia.

The upgrade will in the future involve a taxiway being built for the runway and many more facilities for the airport. There is a master plan for the airport.

Airlines and destinations

Operations

Other Users
The Ballina Aero club, which was established in 1928, has a club house located in the general aviation hangar area. Use of the club house is available to transiting pilots.

Air T&G operate a fleet of helicopters on sight seeing, fire bombing and training duties.

Black Swan Aviation is a general aviation aircraft maintenance facility carrying out all types of maintenance.

Classic Aero Adventure Flights operates a CAC Winjeel on warbird joy flights around the local district.

White Star Aviation provides flight training, Tecnam aircraft sales and FBO services. Cirrus Aircraft also operate an office inside White Star Aviation's facilities.

Australia's only Cirrus Vision SF50 (rego N755DS) is stored at Ballina Byron Gateway Airport.

Gallery

See also
 List of airports in New South Wales

References

External links
Ballina Byron Gateway Airport – Official Website

Airports in New South Wales
Byron Bay, New South Wales
Ballina, New South Wales